, known professionally as 
, is a Japanese voice actor affiliated with Aksent. He is most well known for his role in Digimon Adventure, in which he voiced the character Yamato Ishida, and the protagonist of the Mega Man Zero series, Zero.

Filmography

Anime 
 Ask Dr. Rin! (Takashi Tokiwa)
 Bakuman 2 (Soichi Aida)
 Buso Renkin (Hideyuki Okakura)
 Cromartie High School (Noboru Yamaguchi)
 Digimon Adventure (Yamato Ishida, Gazimon, MetalSeadramon)
 Digimon Adventure 02 (Yamato Ishida, Oldest Boi Brother, Kuwagamon, Mr. Washington)
 Digimon Adventure (2020)  (Valdurmon)
 Kanokon (Saku Ezomori)
 LINE TOWN (James)
 Pocket Monsters (Homura)
 The Prince of Tennis (Billy Cassidy)
 Psychic Academy (Jyuo)
 Rockman EXE Axess (SparkMan)
 Rockman EXE Beast (Zoano SparkMan)
Shooting Star Rockman Tribe (Yeti)
 To Love-Ru (Decamarron)
 Transformers: Galaxy Force (FangWolf/Snarl)
 Wangan Midnight (Yasuhiko Miki)

Video games 
 Mega Man Zero series (Zero, Copy X)
 Mega Man ZX (Girouette, Model Z)
 Rockman ZX Advent (Model Z)
 SNK vs. Capcom: SVC Chaos (Zero)

Drama CDs 
 Mayonaka ni Oai Shimashou (Ryuuji Matsuura)

Dubbing 
 Power Rangers Lost Galaxy (Deviot)
 Marie Antionette (King Louis XVI)

References

External links 
 
 
 

1970 births
Living people
Japanese male voice actors
Japanese male video game actors
Male voice actors from Tokyo